Lago Prizzi is a lake in the Province of Palermo, Sicily, Italy. At an elevation of 638 m, its surface area is 0.9 km2.

Lakes of Sicily